Bomb the Twist is an EP by the Japanese rock band the 5.6.7.8's, released on January 11, 1996. The song "Woo Hoo" was featured in the 2003 film Kill Bill Volume 1, directed by Quentin Tarantino.

Bomb the Twist was recorded for the US record label Sympathy for the Record Industry.

Track listing
 "Bomb the Twist"
 "Jane in the Jungle"
 "Three Cool Chicks"
 "Guitar Date"
 "Woo Hoo"
 "Dream Boy"

Personnel
Ronnie Fujiyama - guitar, vocals, voice
Screaming "Omo" Chellio Panther - bass, backing vocals, voice
Sachiko "Geisha-Girl" Fujii - drums, backing vocals

References

Twist (dance)
1996 albums
The 5.6.7.8's albums
Punk rock albums by Japanese artists